Kaamyaab (English title: Round Figure) is a 2018 Indian Hindi-language drama film directed and written by Hardik Mehta, and produced by Red Chillies Entertainment and Drishyam Films. The film stars Sanjay Mishra and Deepak Dobriyal with Isha Talwar, Nasirr Khan and Sarika Singh appearing in supporting roles. It is the story of a washed up “side-actor” of Hindi movies, who wants to make a comeback with a memorable role so that he can complete a record figure of acting in 500 films.

Plot

Kaamyaab is the journey of Sudheer, a washed up side actor from the heyday of Bollywood. Years after his retirement, he realises that he ‘retired’ on the verge of accomplishing a unique record. He decides to come out of his retirement to complete the round figure of 500 and get that one substantial role for which he will be remembered forever.

Cast
 Sanjay Mishra as Sudheer
 Deepak Dobriyal as Gulati
 Isha Talwar as Isha
 Nasirr Khan as Director Barot
 Sarika Singh as Bhavna
 Avtar Gill as Himself
 Viju Khote as Himself
 Manmauji as Himself
 Guddi Maruti as Herself
 Anil Nagrath as Himself
 Birbal as Himself
 Lilliput as Himself
 Devas Dixit as Casting Assistant
 Akashdeep Arora as Shibu Das
 Devika Vatsa as Casting Assistant
 Kaurwakee Vasistha as Anu
 Shehzad Khan as Himself
 Vikas Verma as Rahul Chopra

Marketing and release
The official announcement for Har Kisse Ke Hisse... Kaamyaab was made by Red Chillies Entertainment on 31 January 2020. Presented by Red Chillies Entertainment, a Drishyam Films production, the film is produced by Gauri Khan, Manish Mundra and Gaurav Verma, and directed by Hardik Mehta.

The film had its world premiere at the 23rd Busan International Film Festival on 5 October 2018. It was released theatrically in India on 6 March 2020.

Soundtrack

The film's songs are composed by Rachita Arora, with lyrics written by Neeraj Pandey.

Reception

Critical response
Pallabi Dey Purkayastha of Times of India gave 4.5/5 rating and termed it as an 'ode to Bollywood'. She found the tonality of the narrative light, subtle, funny and emotional. Praising
writer-director Hardik Mehta for his writing, and the ensemble cast for their performance she concluded that the film was about ability to fulfill dreams, even when the things are not going your way.

Box office
Although, the film was appreciated by critics and audiences alike, the movie was not able to earn at the box office due to clash with a commercial entertainer Baaghi 3 and shutting down of theaters because of the COVID-19 pandemic.

Awards and nominations

Home media
The film was made available for streaming on Netflix on 3 May 2020.

References

External links
 
 

2018 films
2010s Hindi-language films
Indian drama films
Films about Bollywood
Films about actors
2018 drama films
Hindi-language drama films